Canscora diffusa is a plant species in the genus Canscora. Diffutidin and diffutin are flavans, a type of flavonoid, found in C. diffusa.

See also
 List of Australian plant species authored by Robert Brown

References

External links

Gentianaceae
Flora of West Tropical Africa
Flora of Tanzania
Flora of Cameroon
Flora of South Tropical Africa
Flora of Guangxi
Flora of Guizhou
Flora of Yunnan
Flora of tropical Asia
Flora of the Northern Territory
Flora of Queensland
Flora of Western Australia